Samia canningi is a moth of the family Saturniidae. It is found in south-eastern Asia and China.

The larvae mainly feed on Ailanthus altissima, Prunus laurocerasus, Ligustrum and Syringa species. Pupation takes place in a silken cocoon.

This moth is considered to be the wild ancestor of the domesticated species known as Samia ricini; the latter having been named first, however, the protonym Saturnia canningi Hutton, 1859 has been ruled to be a conserved name and is therefore not treated as a junior synonym of S. ricini.

References

External links
saturniidae-web.de

Moths described in 1860
Saturniinae